The Meadowmount School of Music, founded in 1944 by Ivan Galamian, is a 7-week summer school in the town of Lewis (mailing address Westport) in Upstate New York for accomplished young violinists, cellists, violists, and pianists training for professional music careers. The students receive instruction in chamber music and solo performance techniques, practice four to five hours per day, attend masterclasses, studio classes, guest artist workshops, Alexander Technique, and yoga. The extensive campus contains a dining hall, student lounge, infirmary, practice cabins, faculty studios, a concert hall, performance space, recreation areas (tennis, basketball, soccer, table tennis), and student dormitories. Field trips, hiking, and off-campus events are also offered. Concerts are held three times a week and feature students, faculty, and/or guest artists. Master classes are held daily.

The campus in Lewis was originally the home of suffragist Inez Milholland, who spent summers there on her family's property.

Some of the school's more distinguished alumni include:
Joshua Bell
Yo-Yo Ma
Itzhak Perlman
Stephanie Chase
Kyung-wha Chung
James Ehnes
Lynn Harrell
Jaime Laredo
Chin Kim
Michael Rabin
Pinchas Zukerman
Alexander Rybak
Elaine Richey
John Reed
For a full list visit: http://www.meadowmount.com/inner.php?pageid=137

Notable members of the school's faculty have included:
Charles Avsharian
Amy Barlowe
Alan Bodman
David Cerone
Linda Cerone
Dorothy DeLay
Josef Gingold
Clive Greensmith
Matt Haimovitz
Kikuei Ikeda
Hans Jørgen Jensen
Jonathan Koh
Melissa Kraut
Fredell Lack
Eric Larsen, Director
Julia Lichten
Paul Makanowitzky
Kevork Mardirossian
Patricia McCarty
Elmar Oliveira
Margaret Pardee
Gregor Piatigorsky
Gerardo Ribeiro
Channing Robbins
Steven Rochen
Leonard Rose 
Ann Setzer
Jan Mark Sloman
Sally Thomas
Almita Vamos
Roland Vamos
William van der Sloot
Kathleen Winkler
Ivan Ženatý

References 

A Boot Camp For Budding Virtuosos, BusinessWeek, August 20, 2006.
Violin virtuoso: Practice pays off for girl, 11, with big dreams of brilliant future, CNNfyi.com, August 15, 2000.

External links 
 
Meadowmount alumni website

Education in New York (state)
Tourist attractions in Essex County, New York